BARS may refer to:

BARS (Russia),  a Russian military reserve force
BARS (tropospheric scatter network), a Warsaw Pact tropospheric scatter communications network in Eastern Europe
BARS apparatus, a high-pressure apparatus for growing/processing minerals
B.A.R.S. The Barry Adrian Reese Story, an album by hip-hop artist Cassidy
Balanced Automatics Recoil System, a small-arms recoil reduction system developed by Peter Andreevich Tkachev
Behaviorally anchored rating scales, used to report performance in psychology research on behaviorism
British American Railway Services, a train owner and operator in the United Kingdom
Buenos Aires Rojo Sangre, a film festival

Bars may refer to:
Bars, Dordogne, commune of the Dordogne département in France
Bars, Gers, a commune of the Gers département in France
Bars-class submarine (1915) built for the Imperial Russian Navy
Bars county, a former Kingdom of Hungary county in present-day Slovakia
Bars radar, a family of Russian (former USSR) airborne radars
Bars Soviet submarine; see Akula-class submarine
bars, plural of bar

ceb:Bars
de:Bars
es:Bars
fr:Bars
it:Bars
nl:Bars
pl:Bars
scn:Bars